Tours Odyssey is a project to redevelop the Miroirs complex by 2026 into three mixed-use skyscrapers.

Located in the La Défense business district in the city of Courbevoie, near Paris, Towers C/, O/ and D/ will be 187, 174 and 108 m high respectively. Designed by architects Jean-Luc Crochon, Jeanne Gang and Nayla Mecattaf, the complex will be 141,000 m2.

The building permit for the project has been approved in December 2021.

References

External links
 Official website

Skyscrapers in France
Buildings and structures under construction in France
La Défense